Broomfield County Commons Park, a  county park in Broomfield County, Colorado, in the United States, is home to the Paul Derda Recreation Center, County Commons cemetery,  of open space, and the  park and sports complex.

On February 20, 2021, United Airlines Flight 328 departed from the nearby Denver International Airport en route to Honolulu, Hawaii. Parts Departing Aircraft from the affected engine cowling were found in the park. The aircraft returned to Denver International Airport and landed with no reported injuries to passengers or persons on the ground.

References

County parks in the United States